Gokhale Institute of Politics and Economics (GIPE), commonly known as Gokhale Institute, is one of the oldest research and training institutes in economics in India.

History

The institute was founded on 6 June 1930 by R. R. Kale as a centre for research and higher learning in economics. The institute was founded with an endowment offered to the Servants of India Society by Shri R R Kale. The Servants of India Society, a registered body founded by the nationalist leader Gopal Krishna Gokhale, are the trustees of the institute. The institute is registered under the Societies Registration Act, 1860, and the Bombay Public Trusts Act, 1950.

The institute was set up with an objective to conduct research on the economic and political problems of India and to train research workers in these disciplines. D. R. Gadgil was the first director of the institute. It was named a deemed university in 1993.

Research
The major research areas of the institute, developed over the years through financial assistance from various sources, are agricultural economics, population studies, economic history, input–output analysis for planning and development, microeconomics, macroeconomics, monetary economics, financial economics, public economics, international economics and the study of economics of East European countries.

In the early years, the research activities were financed through assistance from various ministries and public funding agencies including the government of Maharashtra and private foundations like the Sir Dorabji Tata Trust. In 1954, the Union Ministry of Food and Agriculture established the Agro-Economic Research Centre of the institute. During the early fifties, the Rockefeller Foundation made a substantial grant, spread over years, for the conduct of a research programme in rural demography. The Union Ministry of Health also gave grants for conducting some specific demographic studies in 1954–57; and in 1964, the ministry decided to strengthen and expand the research work on population by financing on a continuing basis a Population Research Centre as an integral part of the institute. Ford Foundation gave a very generous financial assistance for more than a decade beginning with the year 1956. Later on, the Ford Foundation, in co-operation with the Planning Commission, provided a separate grant for research and training in the areas of planning and development, mainly devoted to input–output studies. In 1962, the University Grants Commission (UGC) recognised the institute as a Centre of Advanced Study in Agricultural Economics to start with and later, in 1964, as a Centre of Advanced Study in Economics. In 1977, the UGC, as a part of its Area Studies Programme, established at the Institute a Centre of Study of Economics of East European Countries. In the same year, the Reserve Bank of India instituted a chair in finance at the institute.

Teaching
Although GIPE was primarily a research institute, it was recognised as an institution for higher learning in the field of economics, and it awarded MA, MPhil and PhD degrees in Economics under recognition from the University of Bombay from 1930 to 1949. With the establishment of the University of Pune in 1949, GIPE became a constituent recognised institution of the University of Pune until 1993. Keeping in view its professional standing and scope for further development, the government of India, on recommendation of the University Grants Commission, declared GIPE as ‘Deemed University’ from 9 May 1993.

Academic programmes
The goal of the institute – to conduct research into the economic and political problems of India and train research workers in these subjects – has been reconceptualised over years so as to confine the activities of the institute to teaching and research in economics alone, leaving aside the political problems of India. However, the applied and empirical research into Indian economic problems and policy evaluations indirectly encompass the political dimensions as well.

The curricular content of the ongoing MSc Economics programme offers a blend of core and applied optional courses. The number of subjects per course have been increased from 16 in the MA programme to 20 in the ongoing MSc programme so as to make the courses more rigorous. The student–faculty ratio is 3:1 for the MSc programme.

Ph.D. programme 
The PhD programme, started right from the inception of the institute, still continues with a highly selective intake and hence a limited output. More than 165 students have obtained their doctoral degrees in different branches of economics since the inception of the institute.

M.Sc. programmes 
GIPE offers nationally recognised two-year M.Sc. programmes in Economics, Financial Economics, Agri-Business Economics and International Business Economics & Finance. Students for each of these programmes are selected through a rigorous nationwide entrance exam that test their analytical, reasoning and quantitative skills. The courses offered at GIPE are unique in a sense that they blend crucial theories and their practical applications helping the students to get industry ready. Details of the courses are as follows:

M.Sc. (Economics) 
The programme is designed to develop among the students a strong, broad-based academic foundation in economic theory and its application, as well as excellent transferable skills that enhance their professional prospects in the banking, finance and business analytics sectors, corporate organizations, government and non-government establishments and regulatory agencies, national and international development agencies.

M.Sc. (Financial Economics) 
The master's degree programme in Financial Economics is distinct from the conventional finance programmes, notably on account of its emphasis on the three-way linkage between macroeconomics, financial markets and financial regulations. Inputs in quantitative finance in the form of compulsory courses in Financial Economics, Computational Finance and Financial Engineering are important highlights of the programme. In addition, the programme provides for full length courses on Project Appraisal & Finance, Structural Products, M&A, and Investment Banking among others.

M.Sc. (Agribusiness Economics) 
The M.Sc. Agribusiness Economics program prepares students for careers in the agribusiness sector, both as officers in agribusiness organizations, and as economists in agribusiness related research organizations. The academic content of the program has three major modules: an economics module, a management module, and an agribusiness module. The economics module equips students with the core economics principles as well as the advanced quantitative techniques that are the basic tools used to analyze questions of business and policy. The agribusiness module complements these tools with a broad grasp of the current theory, data, and issues (both business as well as policy) surrounding the agribusiness sector in India. The management module provides students with an overview of essential managerial skills such as accounting, finance, marketing, supply chain management, risk management, and insurance.

M.Sc. (International Business Economics & Finance) 
This new programme to be offered from the academic year 2016-17 is a unique course designed for careers in international trade, foreign portfolio investment, foreign direct investment, international technical/financial collaboration and joint ventures, international finance and portfolio management, etc.

M.Sc. (Population Studies and Health Economics) 
This program is designed to impart in-depth knowledge of population studies- dynamics of population change along with its linkages with humanities. It is primarily for understanding the interrelationship of population with different social, economic, health and nutrition phenomena. Introduction of health economics completes the missing link of the program on population and health. This gap is bridged here, considering importance of functioning of health system, healthcare delivery and utilization along with health financing and health insurance. This program is expected to shape scholars interested in population, public health and health economics.

M.A. ( Economics )

This programme is designed for careers in different public services and to give advanced level knowledge in microeconomics and macroeconomics 
Additionally this programme includes courses pertaining public economics, monetary microeconomics, basic econometrics, international relations, Indian polity, environmental and resource economics. This programme offers edge to students in economics services.

The current intake for each 
programme is 40 students. The institute also offers a Certificate Course on Computer Applications in Economic Analysis.

B.Sc. programme 
The institute offers a three-year undergraduate degree in Economics, encompassing forty-two courses. In addition to being a quantitative introduction to the discipline, the programme covers finance, management, accounting and sociology. It introduced its first batch in 2019.

Publications
The institute publishes a quarterly journal of economics in English, Artha Vijnana, the first publication of which was made in March 1959. This journal publishes results of research work carried out in the Institute as well as works of scholars from outside the institute after a refereeing process. The institute also publishes research works in the form of books and mimeograph series. The Kale Memorial Lecture, organised by the institute every year on the occasion of the Founder's Day, is published under the Kale Memorial Lecture Series. Over 70 lectures have been delivered under this Lecture Series, and the list of speakers includes such prominent figures as: B R Ambedkar, John Mathai, P C Mahalanobis, V.K.R.V. Rao, K N Raj, V M Dandekar, I G Patel, Andre Beteille, Manmohan Singh, Amresh Bagchi, Jagdish Bhagwati, C Rangarajan and A P J Abdul Kalam. All the Kale Memorial Lectures delivered at the Gokhale Institute are published, and most of the Lectures' Text can be found on JSTOR.

This is a List of Kale Memorial Lectures held at Gokhale Institute of Politics and Economics since 1937.

Campus

There are two hostels, one for boys and another for girls. Adequate hostel accommodation is available for the existing students. The girls’ hostel was designed by the famous architect and urban planner Christopher Charles Benninger during 1996–1998.

The institute campus is a mélange of old and new buildings spread over a large and lush green area. It provides just the right sylvan, solitary and peaceful setting required for learning and researching. After having undergone a recent landscaping, the campus attracts many a visitor as well. The campus consists of an academic block, faculty block, administration block, seminar hall and the Dhananjaya Rao Gadgil Library. There is a conference hall, known as Kale Memorial Hall, on the top floor of the library which is used by the institute and also let out to others on rent. The austere and majestic buildings radiate the old charm characteristic of the Pune city. On the Fergusson Hill behind the institute lies the spot where Gokhale took the vows of the Servants of India Society – poverty, obedience, and service to nation – and administered them to three others. It has become a landmark because of the erection of a column there. Gokhale's bungalow still stands in the precincts of the campus. A massive and graceful banyan tree adds to the charm of the place. This is said to be the tree under which Gopal Krishna Gokhale and Mahatma Gandhi (who regarded Gokhale as his political guru) used to muse over political issues in their times. The residential campus of the GIPE too, is set in the midst of lush greenery and gives the place a uniquely quaint contour, especially in the rains.

Library
The Dhananjaya Rao Gadgil Library is a depository library of the publications of the United Nations and its agencies, the World Bank, the European Economic Community, the International Monetary Fund, and the government of Canada. The library possesses quite a large number of rare books published before the advent of twentieth century and which may not be available elsewhere. The oldest book in the library dates back to 1680. Besides, there are quite a few hundred books which were published during the 18th and 19th centuries.

References

External links

 
 
 
 
 Official website
 Dhananjaya Rao Gadgil Library
 https://alumni.gipe.ac.in/
 Student Activities and Placements

Economic research institutes
Research institutes in Pune
Deemed universities in Maharashtra
Libraries in Maharashtra
Research institutes established in 1930
1930 establishments in India